Statistics of Allsvenskan in season 1938/1939.

Overview 
The league was contested by 12 teams, with IF Elfsborg winning the championship.

League table

Results

Footnotes

References 

Allsvenskan seasons
1938–39 in Swedish association football leagues
Sweden